The 2021 Mid-Eastern Athletic Conference baseball tournament began on May 20 and ended on May 22 at Marty L. Miller Field on the campus of Norfolk State University in Norfolk, Virginia.  It was a six-team double elimination tournament.  Norfolk State won the tournament for the first time and claimed the Mid-Eastern Athletic Conference's automatic bid to the 2021 NCAA Division I baseball tournament.  Departing member Bethune-Cookman, which opted out of baseball competition for 2021, had claimed sixteen of the prior twenty-one tournament championships, with North Carolina A&T earning the 2005 and 2018 titles, Florida A&M winning in 2015 and 2019, and Savannah State in 2013.

Format and seeding
The top two teams from each division qualified for the Tournament, with seeding determined by conference winning percentage from the regular season.  The top seed form the North Division played the second seed from the South and vice versa, with winners advancing and losers playing elimination games in the double-elimination tournament.

Tournament

Bracket

Game results

All-Tournament Team
The following players were named to the All-Tournament Team.

Outstanding Performer and Outstanding Coach
Alsander Womack was named Tournament Outstanding Performer, while Keith Shumate was named Tournament Outstanding Coach.  Womack was a second baseman for Norfolk State, while Shumate was the Spartans' head coach.

References

Tournament
Mid-Eastern Athletic Conference Baseball Tournament
MEAC baseball tournament